Santa María Huatulco  is a town and municipality in Oaxaca in south-western Mexico. 
It is part of the Pochutla District in the east of the Costa Region.
The meaning of Huatulco, or Guatulco Coatulco is, "where they worship the tree", referring to an ancient legend.

Geography
The municipality covers an area of 579.22 km² at an average of 220 meters above sea level. 
The Magdalena and Cruz rivers combine in the municipality to form the  Huatulco river.
Its ecosystem is lowland deciduous and includes mahogany, cedar, cashew and many other species of tree.
Wildlife includes squirrel, opossum, skunk, raccoon, coati, ringtail, armadillos, ocelots and white-tailed deer.

History
Hernán Cortés conquered the town of Huatulco on 8 January 1539.

Demographics
As of 2005, the municipality had a total population of 33,194 of which 1,119 spoke an indigenous language.
The population includes many migrants from other areas drawn by the tourist business.
Economic activities by numbers employed included tourism (40%), cultivation of coffee (30%), fishery (20%) and animal husbandry (10%).

Economy
Tourism development is concentrated in the communities of Santa Cruz, La Crucecita and Tangolunda, with nine bays (Santa Cruz, Chahue, Tangolunda, Conejos, Chacahual, Cacaluta, San Agustín, El Órgano and Maguey) and 36 beaches, as well as ecological reserves that contain diverse nesting birds and reptiles. The municipality is the home of Huatulco National Park.

The area is served by Bahías de Huatulco International Airport.

Climate

Huatulco has a borderline tropical wet and dry climate/semi-arid climate (Köppen Aw/BSh), featuring stable, hot temperatures all year round, with two marked seasons, a dry season from November through May, and a wet season from June through October. UV radiation levels are high all year round, ranging from 8 in December to 11+ between March and September. Heat and humidity are very high all year round.

References

Municipalities of Oaxaca